Local elections to Northumberland County Council, a county council in the north east of England, were held on 2 May 1985. The Labour Party lost overall control of the council, which fell under no overall control.

Results

 
 
 

 17 Liberal, 3 SDP
 27.6 Liberal, 7.9 SDP

References

External links
Northumberland County Council

1985
1985 English local elections
20th century in Northumberland